The Westland Case is a 1937 American mystery film directed by Christy Cabanne and starring Preston Foster, Frank Jenks, and Carol Hughes.

Cast
 Preston Foster as Bill Crane
 Frank Jenks as Doc Williams
 Carol Hughes as Emily Lou Martin
 Barbara Pepper as Agatha Hogan
 Astrid Allwyn as Bentine
 Clarence Wilson as Charlie Frazee
 Theodore Von Eltz as Robert Westland
 George Meeker as Richard Bolston
 Russell Hicks as Woodbury
 Selmer Jackson as Warden

Production
In 1937, Universal Pictures made a deal with the Crime Club who published whodunnit novels. Universal were granted the right to select four of their yearly published novels to adapt into films. The unit responsible for these films was producer Irving Starr. Eleven films were made in the series between 1937 and 1939.  The Westland Case was the first in the series and was based on the Jonathan Latimer novel Headed for a Hearse.

The first films in the series featured Preston Foster as Bill Crane and Frank Jenks as Doc Williams were cast as the wisecracking New York city detectives. These characters would appear in two other films in the series: The Lady in the Morgue and The Last Warning.

Release
The Westland Case was released on October 31, 1937.

References

Footnotes

Sources

External links 
 
 
 

American mystery films
Films directed by Christy Cabanne
1937 mystery films
1937 films
American black-and-white films
Universal Pictures films
1930s American films